Velocity is the debut studio album by American new wave and synth-pop band the Vels, released in 1984 by Mercury Records. It was recorded at Compass Point Studios in Nassau, Bahamas, with producer Steven Stanley, known for his work with Tom Tom Club. When reflecting on the recording of the album, lead vocalist Alice Cohen said, "the whole Compass Point thing was great. We were unassuming Philly folks, living in cheap apartments, suddenly in this amazing studio in the Bahamas. It was very surreal." While the album itself failed to chart, it featured two songs that charted on the U.S. Billboard Dance Club Songs chart, with "Hieroglyphics" peaking at No. 30 and "Look My Way" peaking at No. 39. "Look My Way" also peaked at No. 72 on the U.S. Billboard Hot 100, their only showing on that chart.

To date, the album remains unavailable on CD or MP3, and it has been out of print since its initial release on vinyl and cassette.

Critical reception

Music journalist Robert Christgau gave the album a B+, and stated that "These three Steven Stanley-produced Philadelphians don't just dance in their heads. Not only do they command the spare formal pop eloquence that many popdance minimalists claim and few get next to, they have a generous regard for pop pleasure. Their simple hooks add up to full-fledged tunes, their basic-English lyrics are more than runes. And singer Alice DeSoto is unaffected and vivacious, a rare combination."

Track listing
All songs are written by Alice Desoto, Charles Hansen and Chris Larkin.

Side one
"Tell Me Something" – 3:23
"Secret Garden" – 3:39
"Can't You Hear Me?" – 3:54
"Coming Attractions" – 4:21

Side two
"Look My Way" – 4:38 
"Day After Day" – 3:14
"Private World" – 4:30
"Hieroglyphics" – 5:10

Personnel
Credits are adapted from the Velocity liner notes.

The Vels
 Alice Cohen (as Alice Desoto) — vocals; keyboards; percussion
 Charles Hanson — bass guitar; keyboards; vocals; percussion; guitar
 Chris Larkin — keyboards; vocals; LinnDrums; percussion

Additional musicians
 Sanford Ponder — Fairlight CMI programming
 Chuck Sabo — additional percussion

Production and artwork
 Steven Stanley – producer; engineer
 Benjamin Armbrister – assistant producer
 Peter Lubin – producer (track 2)
 Bruce Tergensen – engineer
 Mark Procopio – assistant engineer
 Jeff Levy – assistant engineer; assistant mixer
 Howie Weinberg – mastering engineer
 Manhattan Design – design
 Frank Olinsky – illustration
 Deborah Feingold – photography
 Bill Levy – art direction

References

External links
 

1984 debut albums
The Vels albums
Mercury Records albums
Synth-pop albums by American artists